The Rothmans World Championship Victory Race was a motor race, run to Formula One rules, held on 24 October 1971 at Brands Hatch, Kent. The race was to be run over 40 laps of the circuit, but was stopped on lap 15 following the fatal accident suffered by Swiss driver Jo Siffert. The result was taken from the race order after 14 laps, with Peter Gethin being declared the winner in his BRM P160. The entry included several Formula 5000 cars which were contesting Round 12 of the 1971 Rothmans European Formula 5000 Championship.

Siffert's accident led to a rapid overhaul of safety, both in-car and on circuit. In the subsequent Royal Automobile Club (the UK organising and regulatory representative of the FIA at the time) investigation, it was discovered that the crash itself caused non-fatal injuries but Siffert had rather been killed by smoke inhalation. None of the trackside fire extinguishers worked, and it was found to be impossible to reach the car and extract Siffert because of the intense fire. On-board fire extinguishers (using BCF—Bromochlorodifluoromethane, an aircraft product) became mandatory and also piped air for the drivers, direct into their helmets.

Qualifying
Note: a blue background indicates a Formula 5000 entrant.

Race
Although the race only lasted for less than half of its intended distance, there were several incidents. On lap 2, Henri Pescarolo and Reine Wisell collided at the Druids hairpin, with both cars retiring. Then Mike Hailwood and Ronnie Peterson also collided and had to pit for repairs. Hailwood's car was deemed unfit to continue, but Peterson rejoined the race, albeit nearly a lap down. Jo Siffert had fallen several places at the start, but had made his way back to 4th by lap 14. Approaching Hawthorn Bend at high speed on lap 15, Siffert's BRM suffered a mechanical failure which pitched it across the track into an earth bank. The car rolled over and caught fire, trapping Siffert underneath, and he died in the flames. The race was stopped with the track blocked, and all the cars were stranded out on the circuit except for John Surtees, who was able to drive around to the pits, his car damaged by debris.

Results

References
Citations

Other sources
 "The Motor Racing Year No.3", Anthony Pritchard, 1972.
 Race results at www.silhouet.com

World Championship Victory Race
Formula 5000 race reports
World Championship Victory Race